Boys in the Street may refer to:

 "Boys in the Street", song by Eddy Grant from the album Going for Broke
 "Boys in the Street", song by Greg Holden